Yelenovskoye is a rural locality (a selo) and the administrative center of Yelenovskoye Rural Settlement of Krasnogvardeysky District, Adygea, Russia. The population was 2693 as of 2018. There are 48 streets.

Geography 
Yelenovskoye is located 12 km southeast of Krasnogvardeyskoye (the district's administrative centre) by road. Saratovsky is the nearest rural locality.

Ethnicity 
The village is inhabited by Russians and Kurds according to the 2010 census.

References 

Rural localities in Krasnogvardeysky District

Kurdish settlements